Futbola klubs 1625 Liepāja, previously SFK Varavīksne, is a football club based in Liepāja that plays in Latvian football's second tier, the First League.

History
The club was founded on December 14, 1999 as SFK Varavīksne and until 2010 played in the Second League. Informally, the football team had existed since 1997. In 2010, Varavīksne won the Second League and were promoted to the First League. SFK Varavīksne was renamed  FK1625 Liepāja in February 2014.

In 1625, the place named "Liepaja" became a town (see town privileges).

Honours
 Second League winners
 2010

League and Cup history

Players

First-team squad
As of 8 May 2015

Notes

External links
  Official website

Liepāja
Football clubs in Latvia
1999 establishments in Latvia